Ivano Beggio (31 August 1944 – 12 March 2018) was an Italian engineer and businessman who was the founder, owner and president of Aprilia.

References 

1944 births
2018 deaths
Aprilia
20th-century Italian businesspeople
20th-century Italian people
21st-century Italian businesspeople
21st-century Italian people
People from the Metropolitan City of Venice